Algorithmics was a Toronto, Ontario based company founded by Ron Dembo that provided risk management software to financial institutions. Founded in 1989, Algorithmics employed over 850 people in 23 global offices, and served more than 350 clients, including 25 of the 30 largest banks in the world, and over two thirds of the CRO Forum of leading insurers.

In January 2005, Algorithmics was acquired by Fitch Group for $175 million, which is also the parent company of Fitch Ratings.

In October 2011, Algorithmics was acquired by IBM for $387 million. IBM OpenPages and Algorithmics will be combined to form a new Risk Analytics pillar within the Business Analytics software division.

Algorithmics was voted as the leading enterprise risk firm for market risk, economic capital risk calculation, risk dashboards and collateral management in Risk magazine's 2010 Technology Rankings. Algorithmics was also selected as the best Risk Analytics Solution Provider in Waters magazine's  annual financial technology rankings.  In 2011, Algorithmics won the Life and Pension Risk award for Best Solvency II provider. In 2007, Algorithmics was selected as one of Canada's Top 100 Employers, as published in Maclean's magazine.

In December 2019, SS&C Technologies acquired Algorithmics from IBM for $88.8 million.

See also
SunGard

References

 A Program to Keep Tabs on Derivatives, The New York Times
 PeopleSoft And Algorithmics Partner On Risk Management, Informationweek
 Risk Vendor Algorithmics Acquired By Fitch, Informationweek
 Risky Business, Fast Company
 Countering The Domino Effect, US Banker: "According to this accepted view, the top-tier vendors are: Algorithmics Inc., Toronto; Infinity Financial Technology Inc., New York; and MKIRisk"

External links
Company Site 
Parent Company Page

Software companies of Canada
Software companies established in 1989
Companies based in Toronto
Risk management companies
Information technology audit
2005 mergers and acquisitions
2011 mergers and acquisitions
IBM acquisitions
Canadian subsidiaries of foreign companies
2019 mergers and acquisitions